Chrysorthenches phyllocladi is a species of moth in the family Plutellidae. It was first described by John S. Dugdale in 1996. It is endemic to New Zealand and has been observed in both the North and South Islands. The larvae of this species feed on Phyllocladus alpinus. Adults have been observed on the wing in February, April and November.

Taxonomy 
This species was first described by John S. Dugdale in 1996. The female holotype, collected by Dugdale at Governors Bush in the Mackenzie District, is held at the New Zealand Arthropod Collection.

Description 

Dugdale described the adults of this species as follows:
This species can be distinguished from similar appearing moths by the pattern of white bands on its forewings, the forewing ground colour of reflective violet, and the long axillary tuft at the base of the hindwing of the male of the species.

Distribution
This species is endemic to New Zealand and is found in the North and South Islands. Along with the type locality this species has been observed in the Taupo, Hawkes Bay, North Canterbury, Westland, Dunedin, Central Otago and Southland regions.

Behaviour 
Adult moths have been collected in February, April, and November, although Dugdale hypothesised that the November specimen was an overwintering adult.

Hosts 

The larval host of this species is Phyllocladus alpinus.

DNA analysis 
In 2020 this species along with the other species in the genus Chrysorthenches had their DNA and morphological characters studied.

References

Moths described in 1996
Plutellidae
Moths of New Zealand
Endemic fauna of New Zealand
Endemic moths of New Zealand